Madiwala lake is one of the biggest lakes in Bangalore, India spread over an area of 114.3 hectare. Legend has it that the lake was built by the Cholas in a day. The water in the lake was fit for drinking till the early 1990s. Since then it has become unfit for drinking  due to industrial waste and sewage entering the waterbody. It has gradually become polluted. 

It is situated in the BTM Layout at 12° 54' 28" North, 77° 37' 0" East in Bangalore city. It is a home to many migratory birds. The lake comes under the administration of Karnataka State Forest Department which carries out the routine maintenance of this lake. There is a children's park as well. The lake received a Rs 25 Crore grant in 2016 from the Lake Development Authority of Bangalore.

Lake Habitat

Birds
The Madiwala lake sees a huge number of Spot-billed Pelican migration in the winter (November–December). These Spot-billed Pelicans live in groups. Their main food is fish. Pelicans take small flight across the lake for fishing. These migratory birds can also be sighted in Sri Lanka. They provide a great sight while landing. Typically their wing spans for about 8.5 feet. Egrets can also be sighted along with these birds.

Gallery

References

Further reading

Madiwala Lake, Bangalore – A place of tranquillity Karnataka.com

S. Kumar, 2006 Sanctuary Asia, Volume 26 Indiana University
Aquatic Ecosystems: Conservation, Restoration, and Management T. V. Ramachandra, Ahalya N., C. Rajasekara Murthy. p. 313

Lakes of Bangalore